In mineral exploration, salting is the process of adding a valuable metal, especially gold or silver, to a sample from a mine to change the value of the sample with intent to deceive potential buyers of the mine. Examples are the  diamond hoax of 1872 and the former Canadian gold company Bre-X. Salting is an example of a confidence trick.

See also
Land patent
Mining
Youngberg, Arizona
Goldfield, Arizona
Highland Park, Yavapai County, Arizona
Mineral rights

References

Confidence tricks
Mineral exploration